Molly Christine Meacher, Baroness Meacher (née Reid; born 15 May 1940), known from 2000 to 2006 as Lady Layard, is a British life peer and former social worker.

Education 

Meacher was educated at the Berkhamsted School for Girls, the University of York, where she received a Bachelor of Arts in economics in 1970, and the University of London, where she received a Certificate of Qualification in Social Work in 1980.

Career 

She worked for the Social Services in North London and for the Mental Health Foundation in the 1980s.

From 1991 to 1994 Meacher was chief adviser to the Russian Government on employment. Following that she became a board member, deputy chair and acting chair of the Police Complaints Authority, posts she held until 2002.

Between 2002 and 2004, she was chair of Security Industry Authority, and in 2004, she was appointed chair of the East London and City Mental Health Trust.

She was chair of the Clinical Ethics Committee for The Central and North West London NHS Trust from 2004 to 2008.

She was chair from 2007 to 2012 of the East London NHS Foundation Trust.

She is president of The Haemophilia Society.

She is a Co-Chair of the All-Party Parliamentary Group for Choice at the End of Life.

Since 2016, she is the Chair of Dignity in Dying.

In October 2021, she read out a statement from Lord Field in the House of Lords during a debate on the Assisted Dying Bill.

Parliamentary career 

On 2 May 2006, she was made a life peer as Baroness Meacher of Spitalfields, in the London Borough of Tower Hamlets, and sits as a crossbencher.  She has been involved in a number of Bills including:
 Housing and Regeneration Bill (2008/9)
 Health & Social Care Bill (2008/9)
 Children & Young Persons Bill (2008/9)
 Human Fertilisation & Embryology Bill (2008/9)
 Health Bill (2009/10)
 Welfare Reform Bill (2009/10)
 Crime & Security Bill (2010/11)
 Equality Bill (2010/11)
 Child Poverty Bill (2010/11)
 Police Reform & Social Responsibility Bill (2011/12)
 Public Bodies Bill (2011/12)
 Crime & Courts Bill (2012/13)
 Welfare Benefits Up-Rating Bill (2012/13)
 Local Government Finance Bill (2012/13)
 Care Bill (2013/14)
 Marriage (Same Sex Couples) Bill (2013/14) including Government Amendment of Baroness Stowell - Legal Status for Humanist Marriages

APPG for Drug Policy Reform 

Since 2011 she has chaired the UK All-Party Parliamentary Group for Drug Policy Reform, which recommends decriminalisation of drugs. In 2012 she chaired the inquiry panel of the APPG into new psychoactive substances. The panel produced a report, Towards a Safer Drug Policy.

As chair of the APPG for Drug Policy Reform, Meacher is leading a European Initiative on drug policy reform at the request of the President of Guatemala.  An interview between Meacher and Italian station Radio Radicale about the trip and forthcoming events was conducted on 26 June 2013.

On 17 October 2013, she led a debate in the House of Lords on UK drugs policy.

Personal life 

In 1962 she married Michael Meacher, with whom she had two sons and two daughters. They divorced in 1987, and in 1991 she married Peter Richard Grenville Layard, Lord Layard. She and her second husband are one of the few couples both to hold titles in their own right.

Works
 Scrounging on the Welfare (1972) Arrow Books 
 To Him Who Hath: A Study of Poverty And Taxation with Frank Field and Chris Pond (1977) 
 New Methods of Mental Health Care Pergamon Press (1979)

References

External links
 All-Party Parliamentary Group for Choice at the End of Life
 All-Party Parliamentary Group for Drug Policy Reform

1940 births
Living people
Crossbench life peers
Euthanasia activists
Life peeresses created by Elizabeth II
People's peers 
Alumni of the University of York
Alumni of the University of London
Spouses of life peers